Irina Mikhailovna Dobrekova (b. 16 February 1931, Leningrad, USSR) is a Soviet Russian painter, graphic artist. She is a member of the Saint Petersburg Union of Artists, regarded as a representative of the Leningrad school of painting.

Early life 

Irina Dobrekova was born on 16 February 1931, in Leningrad, USSR.

In 1961 she graduated from Vera Mukhina Higher School of Art and Industry in Alexander Kazantsev workshop, where she studied under Piotr Buchkin, Arseny Semionov, and Lev Chegorovsky.

Irina Dobrekova has participated in Art Exhibitions since 1965. She painted portraits, landscapes, still lifes, genre scenes, work in oil and tempera painting.

She replaced her art plein air style of 1950-1960 with inventing motives and interest to transfer of internal tension and latent drama in themes, where at first glance, nothing happens. Her 1980s still lifes is distinguished by bright intense color and sharp composition.

In 1972 Irina Dobrekova become a member of Saint Petersburg Union of Artists. From 1960–1970 she repeatedly worked in the House of creativity «Staraya Ladoga».

Her paintings reside in museums and private collections of Russia, France, Germany, Finland, in the U.S., England, and other countries.

See also 
 Leningrad School of Painting
 House of creativity «Staraya Ladoga»
 List of painters of Saint Petersburg Union of Artists
 Saint Petersburg Union of Artists

References

Bibliography 
 Весенняя выставка произведений ленинградских художников. 1965. Каталог. Л., Художник РСФСР, 1970. С.31.
 Весенняя выставка произведений ленинградских художников 1969 года. Каталог. Л., Художник РСФСР, 1970. С.19.
 Наш современник. Каталог выставки произведений ленинградских художников 1971 года. Л., Художник РСФСР, 1972. С.23.
 Каталог Осенней выставки произведений ленинградских художников 1971 года. Л., Художник РСФСР, 1973. С.17.
 По родной стране. Выставка произведений художников Ленинграда. 50 Летию образования СССР посвящается. Каталог. Л., Художник РСФСР, 1974. С.28.
 Наш современник. Вторая выставка произведений ленинградских художников 1972 года. Каталог. Л., Художник РСФСР, 1973. С.12.
 Натюрморт. Выставка произведений ленинградских художников 1973 года. Л., Художник РСФСР, 1973. С.13.
 Наш современник. Зональная выставка произведений ленинградских художников 1975 года. Каталог. Л., Художник РСФСР, 1980. С.28.
 Выставка произведений ленинградских художников, посвящённая 60-летию Великого Октября. Л., Художник РСФСР, 1982. С.24.
 Осенняя выставка произведений ленинградских художников. 1978 года. Каталог. Л., Художник РСФСР, 1983. С.8.
 Справочник членов Союза художников СССР. Т.2. М., Советский художник, 1979. С.541.
 Зональная выставка произведений ленинградских художников 1980 года. Каталог. Л., Художник РСФСР, 1983. С.13.
 Справочник членов Ленинградской организации Союза художников РСФСР. Л., Художник РСФСР, 1987. С.39.
 Ленинградские художники. Живопись 1950-1980 годов. Каталог. СПб., Выставочный центр ПСХ, 1994. С.3.
 Лирика в произведениях художников военного поколения. Выставка произведений. Каталог. СПб., Мемориальный музей Н. А. Некрасова, 1995. С.3.
 Sergei V. Ivanov. Unknown Socialist Realism. The Leningrad School. Saint Petersburg, NP-Print Edition, 2007. P.26, 106, 132, 360, 392, 395-399, 404, 405, 418, 422, 423. , .

1931 births
20th-century Russian painters
21st-century Russian painters
Soviet painters
Socialist realist artists
Leningrad School artists
Russian women painters
Living people
Saint Petersburg Stieglitz State Academy of Art and Design alumni
Members of the Leningrad Union of Artists
20th-century Russian women artists
21st-century Russian women artists